Jacqueline Harpman (5 July 1929 – 24 May 2012) was a Belgian writer who wrote in French.

She was born on 5 July 1929, in Etterbeek, Belgium, and was later well known for her books written in French. Her father being a Dutch-born Jew, Harpman's family fled to Casablanca, Morocco when the Nazis invaded during World War Two and they did not return home until the war had ended. After studying French literature, Harpman began training to become a doctor but could not complete her studies as she contracted tuberculosis. She began writing in 1954 and her first work, L'Amour et l'acacia, was published in 1958. In 1980, she qualified as a psychoanalyst. I Who Have Never Known Men was her first book to be published in English, and was originally published with the title The Mistress of Silence.

She died on 24 May 2012, in Brussels, Belgium, after having been severely ill for a long time. She was 82.

In 2019, an avenue in Brussels was named after her in acknowledgement of her works.

Works

 L'Amour et l'acacia – 1958
 Brève Arcadie – 1959 (winner of the Prix Rossel) 
 L'Apparition des esprits – 1960 
 Les Bons Sauvages – 1966
 La Mémoire trouble – 1987
 La Fille démantelée – 1990
 La Plage d'Ostende – 1991
 La Lucarne – 1992
 Le Bonheur dans le crime – 1994
 Moi qui n'ai pas connu les hommes – 1995
 Orlanda – 1996 (winner of the Prix Médicis) 
 L'Orage rompu – 1998
 Dieu et moi – 1999
 Récit de la dernière année – 2000
 Le véritable amour – 2000
 La vieille dame et moi – 2001
 En quarantine – 2001
 La Dormition des amants – 2002
 Le Passage des éphémères – 2003
 En toute impunité – 2006

References 

1929 births
2012 deaths
Belgian psychologists
Belgian women psychologists
Prix Médicis winners
Belgian women writers